Eleven ships of the Royal Navy have been named HMS Providence. Another was intended to bear the name:

 was a 30-gun ship launched in 1637 and wrecked in 1668.
 was a 6-gun fireship purchased in 1665 and sunk in action in 1666.
 was a 6-gun fireship purchased in 1672 and lost in 1673.
 was an 8-gun fireship purchased in 1678 and sold in 1686.
 was a 12-gun sloop captured from the Americans in 1779 and listed until 1780.
 was a 28-gun fifth-rate, previously the American . She was captured in 1780 and sold in 1784.
 was a 16-gun storeship purchased in 1782 and sold in 1784.
 was a 12-gun sloop launched in 1791 and wrecked in 1797.
 was a 14-gun schooner purchased in 1796 and expended as a fireship in 1804.
HMS Providence was to have been a cutter tender. The renaming was cancelled however.
 was a Coastguard cutter launched in 1866 and sold in 1870.
 was an  built as  but renamed before being launched in 1943. She was scrapped in 1958.

In popular culture 
 In the 2011 film Pirates of the Caribbean: On Stranger Tides, the fictional HMS Providence appears as Hector Barbossa's privateer frigate.
In Assassin's Creed III the ship that takes the protagonist, Haytham Kenway, to Boston is a British merchant ship named Providence.

See also
 was a ketch captured from the French in 1691 and recaptured by them in 1707.

Royal Navy ship names